Eucosma wimmerana is a species of moth of the family Tortricidae. It is found in China (Tianjin, Hebei, Henan, Shaanxi, Gansu, Xinjiang), Mongolia, Japan, Russia, Kazakhstan and Europe, where it has been recorded from Sicily, France, the Netherlands, Germany, Austria, Switzerland, Italy, the Czech Republic, Slovakia, Poland, the Baltic region, Slovenia and Romania.

The wingspan is 14–17 mm. Adults are on wing from June to July.

The larvae feed on Artemisia campestris and Artemisia dracunculus. Larval feeding results in gall formation. The gall has the form of a swelling of the apical part of the main shoot. The larvae have a yellowish or reddish body and blackish-brown head. Pupation takes place within the gall or in the soil. Larvae can be found from September to May.

References

Moths described in 1835
Eucosmini